KPilot is a KDE application intended to replace the functionality of the Palm Desktop by allowing the KDE Desktop and associated applications to communicate with a Palm device. Pilot-link is used for the connection with the device.

KPilot was featured in the first issue of Tux Magazine, and has been featured as a KDE "App of the Month".

There is a Google Summer of Code project to prepare KPilot for KDE 4.2.

KPilot is distributed as part of the Kdepim module.

In January 2010 it was announced that there would be no further development of KPilot, citing that the developers no longer use Palm devices.

See also 
 J-Pilot
 Palm Desktop

References

External links 
 KPilot Homepage

KDE software
Kdepim